Braunau in Rohr Abbey (Kloster Braunau in Rohr) is a Benedictine monastery, formerly Rohr Abbey, a monastery of the Augustinian Canons, in Rohr in Niederbayern in the district of Kelheim in Bavaria, Germany.

Rohr Abbey: First foundation
The monastery, dedicated to the Assumption of the Blessed Virgin Mary, was founded in 1133 by Adalbert of Rohr. It was dissolved in the secularization of 1803 when the German princes substituted church lands for property they had lost through Napoleon. In the east wing the parish priest's offices and a school were accommodated, and in a part of the west wing, an inn. The remaining buildings were demolished.

Abbey church
The abbey church, dedicated, like the abbey, to the Assumption, contains a high altar, which represents the Assumption of the Virgin in fully three-dimensional sculpture: a "Theatrum sacrum". It was created by Egid Quirin Asam in 1722 and 1723.

Braunau in Rohr Abbey: Second foundation
After World War II the exiled German Benedictine monks from Braunau Abbey (Braunau is now Broumov in the Czech Republic) were lodged here in part of the east wing. They gradually re-established their community, acquiring little by little the remaining parts of the entire monastery complex. The monks have re-established a secondary school here.

The abbey has been part of the Bavarian Congregation of the  Benedictine Confederation since 1984.

External links
 Braunau-Rohr Website (also with good English text)
  Klöster in Bayern

Benedictine monasteries in Germany
Monasteries in Bavaria
1130s establishments in the Holy Roman Empire
1133 establishments in Europe
1130s establishments in Germany
Religious organizations established in the 1130s
Christian monasteries established in the 12th century